The Rural Municipality of Maple Bush No. 224 is a rural municipality (RM) in the Canadian province of Saskatchewan within Census Division No. 7 and  Division No. 2. It is located in the southwest portion of the province.

History 
The RM of Maple Bush No. 224 incorporated as a rural municipality on December 13, 1909.

Geography 
The RM is adjacent to Lake Diefenbaker and is home to Douglas Provincial Park.

Communities and localities 
The following urban municipalities are surrounded by the RM.

Villages
Riverhurst

Resort villages
Mistusinne

The following unincorporated communities are within the RM.

Localities
Gilroy
Grainland
Lawson, dissolved as a village, December 31, 1985

Demographics 

Attractions  
 Douglas Provincial Park
 Elbow crater
 F.T. Museum
 Palliser Regional Park
 Qu'Appelle River Dam
 Riverhurst Ferry

Government 
The RM of Maple Bush No. 224 is governed by an elected municipal council and an appointed administrator that meets on the second Wednesday of every month. The reeve of the RM is Maurice Bartzen while its administrator is JoAnne 'Rene' Wandler. The RM's office is located in Riverhurst.

References 

M